Matarazzo is an Italian family name from Campania with a small stock present in Sicily. In the variants Matarazzi, Matarozzi, Materazzi and Materazzo it is present in Tuscany and Latium.

It may refer to:

People
 Andrea Matarazzo, Brazilian industrialist and politician
 Ciccillo Matarazzo (1898–1977), Brazilian industrialist and arts patron
 Count Francesco Matarazzo (1854–1937), 20th Century Italian-Brazilian industrialist
 Eduardo Matarazzo Suplicy (born 1941), Brazilian politician
  (1883-1920), Brazilian entrepreneur, also the name of an area of São Paulo:
 Subprefecture of Ermelino Matarazzo, São Paulo
 Ermelino Matarazzo (district of São Paulo)
 Maria Angélica Matarazzo, Brazilian historian, wife of Óscar R. Benavides, son of Peruvian president Óscar R. Benavides.
 Francesco Matarazzo (1443–1518), Italian historian, author of Chronicles of the City of Perugia 1492-1503
 Gaten Matarazzo (born 2002), American actor
 Heather Matarazzo (born 1982), American actress
 James Matarazzo (1941-2018), American academic
 John Matarazzo, Italian-American gangster with the Genovese crime family
 Maysa Matarazzo (1936–1977), Brazilian singer
 Mike Matarazzo (1966–2014), American bodybuilder
 , American actor
 Pellegrino Matarazzo, American professional soccer coach who is currently the head coach of Bundesliga club VfB Stuttgart. 
 Raffaello Matarazzo (1909–1966), Italian writer and film director
 Jade Matarazzo (1954), award-Winning photographer. Great-niece of Ciccillo.
 Andrew Matarazzo (1997), actor. Son of Jade Matarazzo

Other uses
 9111 Matarazzo, an asteroid discovered by Giuseppe Matarazzo
 Four Sisters Winery at Matarazzo Farm, a winery in New Jersey